The 36th César Awards ceremony was presented by the Académie des Arts et Techniques du Cinéma in Paris, France, to honour its selection of the best French films of 2010 on 25 February 2011. The ceremony was chaired by Jodie Foster and hosted by Antoine de Caunes. The audience gave a standing ovation to Olivia de Havilland, their "special honored guest".

Winners and nominees

Films with multiple nominations and awards 

The following films received multiple nominations:

The following films received multiple awards:

Viewers
The show was followed by 2.9 million viewers. This corresponds to 14.5% of the audience.

See also
 83rd Academy Awards
 64th British Academy Film Awards
 23rd European Film Awards
 16th Lumières Awards
 1st Magritte Awards

References

External links

 Official website
 
 36th César Awards at AlloCiné

2011
2011 in French cinema
2011 film awards